Dem Täter auf der Spur is a German television series.

See also
Episodes Dem Täter auf der Spur
List of German television series

External links
 

German crime television series
1960s German police procedural television series
1970s German police procedural television series
1960s German television series
1967 German television series debuts
1973 German television series endings
Television shows set in France
Das Erste original programming
German-language television shows